The Hydra Club was a social organization of science fiction professionals and fans.  It met in New York City during the 1940s and 1950s.

History
It was founded October 25, 1947 in the apartment of Judith Merril and Frederik Pohl on Grove Street in the Greenwich Village neighborhood of New York.  As nine founders were present, the club took its name from the legendary nine-headed monster, the Hydra.

Among its members were  Lester del Rey, David A. Kyle, Frederik Pohl, Judith Merril, Martin Greenberg, Robert W. Lowndes, Philip Klass, Jack Gillespie, David Reiner, L. Jerome Stanton, Fletcher and Inga Pratt, Willy Ley, George O. Smith, Basil Davenport, Sam Merwin, Harry Harrison, Jerome Bixby, Groff Conklin, Bea Mahaffey, Murray Leinster, Jack Coggins, Avram Davidson and J. Harry Dockweiler.

An article by Merril about the club in the November 1951 Marvel Science Fiction was accompanied by Harry Harrison's drawing caricaturing 41 members:

 Basil Davenport
 Bruce Elliott
 Charles Dye
 Damon Knight
 Daniel Keyes
 David A. Kyle
 Evelyn Harrison
 Fletcher Pratt
 Frank Belknap Long
 Frederik Pohl
 Fredric Brown
 George C. Smith
 Groff Conklin
 H. Beam Piper
 H. L. Gold
 Hans Stefan Santesson
 Harry Harrison
 Isaac Asimov
 James A. Williams
 Jerome Bixby
 Judith Merril
 Katherine MacLean Dye
 L. Jerome Stanton
 L. Sprague de Camp
 Larry T. Shaw
 Lester Del Rey
 Lois Miles Gillespie
 Margaret Bertrand
 Martin Greenberg
 Olga Ley
 Oswald Train
 Philip Klass
 Richard Wilson
 Robert W. Lowndes
 Sam Bowne
 Sam Merwin, Jr.
 Theodore Sturgeon
 Thomas S. Gardner
 Walter I. Bradbury
 Walter Kubilius
 Willy Ley

Harrison's caption adds, "The remaining twenty-odd members showed up too late at the meeting."

References

External links
 About the Hydra Club by Frederik Pohl
 Key to the Hydra Club by Mike Glyer in File 770

Science fiction fandom